Pursued (1925) is an American action drama movie that was released on 30 Aug 1925. It was distributed by Ellbee Pictures. It was produced by William T. Lackey, directed by Dell Henderson and written by J. Benson Stafford.

Described in 1927: ...one of the most thrilling and entertaining photoplays of the year, say film critics who have seen the picture.

Plot
Dorothy Drew is assisting in rescuing her boyfriend, Gaston Glass, who is an assistant district attorney, abducted by a gang of murderers. After locating the gang's hideout, by posing as the notorious female gangster, Chicago Ann, who always dresses in male clothing, Drew succeeds in having the gang leader drawn to her, but his gun moll exposes the impersonation. Drew is captured and held prisoner. The place is then raided. Glass rescued.

TCM's Synopsis:
Dick Manning, an assistant district attorney, who is on the track of a gang of murderers, is abducted while visiting his sweetheart, Helen Grant. Helen's police dog tracks down the abductors, and Helen goes to their den, passing herself off as Chicago Ann, a notorious female gangster who dresses in men's clothing. The leader of the gang is attracted to Helen, but his jealous sweetheart exposes her as a fraud. Helen is made prisoner, but she manages to escape with the help of a friendly gangster. Helen alerts the police, and the den is raided in time to save Dick's life.

Cast
Gaston Glass
Lafe McKee
Gertrude Astor
Stuart Holmes
Arthur Rankin
Marcella Daly
George Siegmann.

References 

1925 films
1925 crime films
American crime films
Films directed by Dell Henderson
1920s English-language films
1920s American films